Karl Reisinger (8 April 1936 – 24 October 2009) was an Austrian judoka. He competed in the men's lightweight event at the 1964 Summer Olympics.

References

1936 births
2009 deaths
Austrian male judoka
Olympic judoka of Austria
Judoka at the 1964 Summer Olympics
Place of birth missing
20th-century Austrian people